The term custom wheel refers to the wheels of a vehicle which have either been modified from the vehicle manufacturer's standard or have replaced the manufacturer's standard.

Uses
Custom wheels are one of the most common ways in which automobile enthusiasts customize their vehicles.  Competition-oriented enthusiasts typically switch to lighter, stronger, or larger wheels, while appearance-oriented enthusiasts more often choose larger and more visually distinctive wheels.

The most-desirable characteristics of custom wheels vary with owner's goals:

Popularity
Custom wheels are increasing in popularity year after year.  Nearly one-third of all new-vehicle buyers customize their vehicles with custom wheels. Custom wheel spinners for custom wheels then came about in the late 1990s and got extremely popular in the new millennium. The popularity has even grown further by the introduction of larger wheel and spinner diameters such as 18" / 20" / 22" / 24" / 26" and even up to 30" inch wheels diameters.

Custom wheel spinners

Custom wheel spinners also known as "Tru-Spinners" and "free-spinning spinners" were a decorative kinetic attachment to the center of the wheel of an automobile that would continue to rotate after the wheel had stopped. Many were normal-sized to the center of the wheel and then some were enlarged spinners as the wheel market experienced a demand for larger and larger diameter wheels and spinners. Some would also cover the entire wheel rim on some applications, hence the name "spinner rims". They operated when the automobile wheel stopped rotating the Tru-Spinners would continue to stay in motion spinning. Then once Tru-Spinners had stopped spinning and were in a stationary position, they would not start to spin again until the wheel started rotating and again picking up momentum from the rotating wheel itself. They were designed to independently rotate and spin by using one or more roller bearings to isolate the spinner from the wheel, enabling it to spin while the wheel is at rest. In the early stages of the invention during the mid 1990s, the Tru-Spinners invention was only used on custom cars and on show cars in competitions which continued on into the 2000s. The spinner wheels were invented by American inventor James J.D. Gragg of the United States who was awarded spinner patent, United States Patent #5,290,094 on March 4, 1994 with foreign patents to follow.

Later at the turn of the new millennium the popularity grew worldwide and other patents were issued within the United States. In 2003 on April 29 David Fowlkes was issued a United States patent for a free-spinning spinner wheel patent #6,554,370. When David Fowlkes could not get a booth at the Los Angeles Car Show, he asked Latrell Sprewell to allow him to showcase them there in his booth. This is where many people started to mistakenly believe that Latrell Sprewell, professional NBA basketball player, had invented them and so went the nickname in the rap music community calling them “Sprewells” as some rap music even included nickname in the lyrics of rap songs.

Finishes
Custom wheels come in many different finishes.  The most common custom wheel finishes are Chrome, Polished and Painted.  Chrome wheels consist of traditional chrome plating as well as the new process of PVD (Physical Vapor Deposition) Chrome.  PVD chrome wheels are protected with a clear coat and are now being introduced by several wheel companies.  Polished wheels are simply aluminum wheels that have been polished to a shine.  Polished wheels may or may not be protected by a clear coat.  Polished wheels that do not have a clear coat are prone to oxidation and may require periodic polishing to maintain its finish.  Painted wheels come in many different colors and may also have a machined surface incorporated into it.  Silver and black painted wheels are the most common painted finishes.  Painted wheels are protected with a clear coat. Tru-Spinners produced a Custom 22" Wheel known as the .357 Magnum Wheel Spinners that looked like a loaded gun cylinder with the .357 Magnum bullets that were 24-carat gold-plated that spun and then would then stop on the openings which appeared to be the loaded chambers using magnets to correctly align them.

Physics
At some point, the performance advantage of larger wheels and reduced-profile tires meets the performance disadvantage of increased inertia and increased unsprung weight.  This point varies depending on the vehicle, style of wheel, and driving style; however, most vehicles do not see a performance increase when rims are more than two sizes larger than original-equipment specifications.  Appearance-oriented enthusiasts may feel that decreased performance and an increased risk of road damage from the use of oversized rims is a worthwhile price to pay for the look they want.

Theft
Newer aftermarket rims may be worth thousands of dollars.  Owners use special lug nuts, called wheel locks, to secure them, although it renders the vehicle difficult to service, and there are doubts as to how well the locks thwart determined thieves.

See also
Dub (wheel)
DUB Magazine
Alloy wheel

References 

Automotive accessories
Vehicle modifications
Wheels